A submarine squadron (SUBRON) is a naval formation or unit in such states such as the United Kingdom, United States, and Russia/Soviet Union.

Royal Navy
Submarine flotillas became submarine divisions in 1952.
 was a Porpoise-class submarine belonging first to Faslane's 3rd Submarine Squadron and then to Singapore's 7th Submarine Squadron (United Kingdom).

From the early 1960s the structure was:
1st Submarine Squadron – 
2nd Submarine Squadron – Plymouth
3rd Submarine Squadron – Faslane
4th Submarine Division – Sydney (established 1948, disbanded 1969)
5th Submarine Division – Malta. It was announced on 31 July 1964, that British submarines were to leave Malta. Captain C.H. Hammer was last Captain S.M. 5. HMS Ausonia, the division depot ship, set sail for the UK on 7 August 1964, and then paid off. Submarine depot ships at Malta were Forth (1948–1960), HMS Narvik (1960–1962), and then Ausonia from 1962 to 1964.
6th Submarine Division – Halifax, Nova Scotia Three A-class submarines arrived 1954,  served with the division, disbanded c. 1967)
7th Submarine Division – Singapore (disbanded by 1971)
10th Submarine Squadron – Formed Faslane late 1960s for the SSBNs

In 1971 HMNB Clyde at Faslane in Scotland was home to the Third Submarine Squadron of Nuclear Fleet and Diesel Patrol Submarines, 'the fighters', and the 10th Submarine Squadron consisting of the four Polaris submarines, 'the bombers'. The Base also conducted the training of all submarines before they joined their Squadrons and this was known as 'work up'. On the decommissioning of the Polaris submarines the 10th Submarine Squadron re-equipped with  ballistic missile submarines.

1st Submarine Squadron was located at HMS Dolphin during the early 1990s. In 2001, the five s were part of the 1st Submarine Squadron based at Faslane and the seven  boats were with the Second Submarine Squadron at Devonport.

See List of squadrons and flotillas of the Royal Navy.

Canada

From 1966 to 1996 the First Canadian Submarine Squadron was in existence with the Royal Canadian Navy's three Oberon-class submarines.

United States Navy
Up until World War II and for a little after, submarine squadrons could have several Submarine Divisions (SubDivs), often pairs of submarines.  Reserve submarine divisions also existed after World War II.

A SUBRON usually consists of three or more submarines.  It is the submarine force equivalent to a destroyer squadron in the surface Navy.  The officer in charge of SUBRON ONE is designated Commander Submarine Squadron One or COMSUBRON ONE. However, unlike a destroyer squadron—which actually moves its staff aboard its ships and deploys with them as an operational Task Element commander—a SUBRON commander and his staff always remain in homeport, and are responsible only for the training, equipping and administering of the ships under its umbrella. A submarine squadron is usually commanded by a Captain (O-6) who has already had at least one tour as commander of a submarine.

Several submarine squadrons may be organized into a Submarine Group (SUBGRU), headed under a flag officer.  For instance, SUBRON 17, SUBRON 19 and DEVRON 5 are part of SUBGRU 9 in Bangor, Washington.  The overall responsibility for submarines on the west coast of the United States is taken by the Commander Submarine Force, U.S. Pacific Fleet (COMSUBPAC); on the east coast, the same responsibility rests with the Commander Submarine Force, Atlantic Fleet (COMSUBLANT).  The latter is the senior of the two, and thus also plays a secondary role as Commander, Submarine Force (COMSUBFOR).

When a submarine deploys, for instance as part of a carrier strike group, operational command is transferred to the numbered fleet commander for the theater to which the submarine is deploying, e.g., Commander Fifth Fleet.

List of submarine squadrons
Odd numbered squadrons are West Coast (Pacific Fleet), even numbered East Coast (Atlantic Fleet).

Pacific Fleet squadrons

Atlantic Fleet squadrons

List of submarine groups

References

External links
U.S. Submarine Squadron commanders during the Second World War

Submarine squadrons